Michel Quint (born 1948) is a French writer from the Nord-Pas-de-Calais.

Works
 Le testament inavouable, Fleuve Noir 
 Mauvaise conscience, Fleuve Noir 
 Posthume, Fleuve Noir
 Hôtel des deux roses, Fleuve Noir
 Bella ciao, Fleuve Noir
 La dernière récré, Fleuve Noir
 Mascarades, Fleuve Noir
 Les grands ducs, Calmann-Lévy
 Aimer à peine (2001)
 Corps de ballet, Estuaires (2006)
 Sur les pas de Jacques Brel (2008), Presses de la Renaissance
 L'espoir d'aimer en chemin (2006), Gallimard
 Jadis, Fleuve Noir
 Lundi perdu, éditions Joëlle Losfeld
 Cake walk, éditions Joëlle Losfeld
 L'éternité sans faute, Rivages
 Une ombre, sans doute (2008) éditions Joëlle Losfeld-Gallimard
 Et mon mal est délicieux, Gallimard, 2005
 Aimer à peine, Joëlle Losfeld, 2002
 Billard à l'étage, Rivages, 1989
 Effroyables jardins, Joëlle Losfeld, 2000
 Le Bélier noir, Rivages, 1999
 Sanctus, Terrain Vague, 1990
 À l'encre rouge, Rivages, 1985
 Cadavres au petit matin, Souris Noire.

References

1948 births
Living people
French male writers